Tristán Suárez is a town in the Ezeiza Partido. Buenos Aires Province, Argentina. It forms part of the Greater Buenos Aires urban conurbation.

Name 
The town used to be called Llavallol but it was renamed in homage to railway pioneer Tristán Suárez.

Sport 
The town is home to football club C.S.D. Tristán Suárez, who play in the lower leagues of Argentine football.

External links 

Populated places in Buenos Aires Province
Populated places established in 1885
Ezeiza Partido